Camp Island is located in the Lyons River, a tributary of the Gascoyne River in the Gascoyne region of Western Australia.

References

Islands of the Gascoyne